Kherlenbayan-Ulaan  is a settlement in the Delgerkhaan sum (district) of Khentii Province in eastern Mongolia.

Kherlenbayan-Ulaan is an arable farming center.

Populated places in Mongolia